This is a complete list of compositions by Claude Debussy initially categorized by genre, and sorted within each genre by "L²" number, according to the 2001 revised catalogue by musicologist François Lesure, which is generally in chronological order of composition date. "L¹" numbers are also given from Lesure's original 1977 catalogue.

(The "L¹" and "L²" headers are clickable and doing so will sort the entire list by L¹ or L² number. Clicking that header again will reverse the order; to return to the genre category order, reload the webpage.)

List of compositions

Notes

References

External links
 Catalogue François Lesure des œuvres de Claude Debussy on Musicbrainz (has both versions of Lesure's catalogue, with newer updates to the 2001 version).
 Piano Library: Claude Debussy Complete list of Debussy piano works with musical extracts, difficulty ratings and recommended editions.
 Le martyre de Saint-Sébastien, vocal score, transcribed by André Caplet (from the Sibley Music Library Digital Scores Collection at the University of Rochester)
 Le martyre de Saint Sébastien, La chambre magique: prélude (acte II), orchestral score (from the Sibley Music Library Digital Scores Collection)

 
Debussy
Debussy, Claude